Harry Keller (22 February 1913 – 19 January 1987) was an American film editor, producer and director, who made a number of westerns and worked for many years at Universal Pictures.

In 1958, Keller was tasked by Universal Pictures with directing re-shoots and additional scenes on the Orson Welles film Touch of Evil.

Select Credits

 The Witness Vanishes  (1939) editor
Inside Information  (1939)
 Mystery of the White Room (1939)
Black Hills Express (1943) editor
Days of Old Cheyenne (1943) editor
Sheriff of Sundown (1944) editor
Northwest Outpost (1947) editor
Moonrise (1948) editor
The Blonde Bandit (1949) director
The Red Menace (1949) editor
The Arizona Cowboy (1950) editor
Tarnished (1950) director
Fort Dodge Stampede (1951) assoc. producer
Desert of Lost Men (1951) associ. producer
Belle Le Grand (1951) director
The Dakota Kid (1951) editor
Thundering Caravans (1952) director
Black Hills (1952) assoc. producer
Rose of Cimarron (1952) director
Leadville Gunslinger (1952) assoc. producer
Marshal of Cedar Rock (1953) director
Bandits of the West (1963) director
Savage Frontier (1953) director
El Paso Stampede (1953) director
Red River Shore (1953) director
Phantom Stallion (1954) assoc. producer
The Unguarded Moment (1956) director
Man Afraid (1957) director
Quantez (1957) director
The Female Animal (1958) director
Day of the Badman (1958) director
Voice in the Mirror (1958) director
Touch of Evil (1958) - director, additional scenes and re-shoots
Step Down to Terror (1958) director
Texas John Slaughter (1960) director
Seven Ways from Sundown (1960) director
Tammy Tell Me True (1961) director
Six Black Horses (1962) director
Tammy and the Doctor (1963) director
The Brass Bottle (1964) director
Kitten with a Whip (1964) producer
Send Me No Flowers (1964) producer
Mirage (1965) producer
That Funny Feeling (1965) producer
Texas Across the River (1966) producer
In Enemy Country (1968) producer
Skin Game (1971) producer

References

External links

Harry Keller at TCMDB

American film producers
American film directors
1913 births
1987 deaths
20th-century American businesspeople